Bani Sawi is a sub-district located in Al Qafr District, Ibb Governorate, Yemen. Bani Sawi had a population of  6108 as of 2004.

References 

Sub-districts in Al Qafr District